Judy is the surname of:

 Eric Judy (born 1974), American musician
 John F. Judy (1856–1931), founder of Judyville, Indiana
 Samuel Judy (1773–1838), American pioneer and legislator
 Steven Timothy Judy (1956–1981), American mass murderer
 Thomas Judy (1804–1879), American legislator
 Phillip Judy, founder of the Judy Company

Fictional characters
 Doug Judy, recurring character on the American television series Brooklyn Nine-Nine